David A. Whitsell (June 14, 1936 – October 7, 1999) was an American football cornerback in the National Football League (NFL) for the Detroit Lions, the Chicago Bears, and the New Orleans Saints. He was selected to the Pro Bowl after the 1967 season.  Whitsell played college football at Indiana University. Dave was married to Jacque Whitsell. They had four children daughters Amy and Lisa, sons Mike and Dave.

Dave Whitsell attended Shelby High School in Shelby, Michigan, a small town in West Michigan near Lake Michigan.  He earned 16 high school letters in football, basketball, track, and baseball, graduating in 1954.

For 12 seasons (1958–1960, 1961–66, 1967–69), he played at the cornerback and defensive back positions in the National Football League with the Lions, Bears, and Saints. 

Born David Andrew Whitsell, he played collegiate football at Indiana University in Bloomington. He was chosen by the Detroit Lions in the 24th round of the 1958 NFL Draft, and appeared in 36 career games with them.

With the Chicago Bears he was one of the members of the 1963 National Football League championship team, which included Rosey Taylor, Richie Petitbon and future coach Mike Ditka at tight end. The game, which was played on December 29, 1963, at Wrigley Field in Chicago, pitted the visiting New York Giants against the Bears in the 31st annual event. The Bears won, 14–10.

After three years with the Bears he became a Saint for the team's 1967 inaugural season. During the NFL's expansion draft, New Orleans was able to pick players from existing teams. He became the first member of the New Orleans franchise to play in the NFL's Pro Bowl game. Whitsell also led the entire league in 1967 in interceptions with 10. 

After his retirement from football he became a real estate investor. He was also a member of the National Football League Retired Players Association and the Kenner North Kiwanis Club. Whitsell was inducted into the Muskegon Area Sports Hall of Fame in 1989 and the New Orleans Saints Hall of Fame  in 1996. He was diagnosed with colon and prostate cancer in 1995 and died from it in 1999.

References

External links 
 

1936 births
1999 deaths
Players of American football from Michigan
American football cornerbacks
Indiana Hoosiers football players
Detroit Lions players
Chicago Bears players
New Orleans Saints players
Eastern Conference Pro Bowl players